Gunther Tiersch (born 30 April 1954) is a meteorologist, and a former competition rower and Olympic champion for West Germany.

Tiersch won a gold medal in the eight at the 1968 Summer Olympics in Mexico City, as coxswain for the rowing team from West Germany.
Since 1987 he has been working as a meteorologist for German TV.

References

1954 births
Olympic rowers of West Germany
Rowers at the 1968 Summer Olympics
Olympic gold medalists for West Germany
Living people
Olympic medalists in rowing
West German male rowers
Medalists at the 1968 Summer Olympics
Coxswains (rowing)
European Rowing Championships medalists